The 2008–09 Liga II was the 69th season of the second tier of the Romanian football league system. The season began on 16 August 2008 and lasted until 13 June 2009.

The format has been maintained to two series, each of them consisting of 18 teams. At the end of the season, the top two teams of the series promoted to Liga I and the bottom fourth places from both series relegated to Liga III.

Team changes

To Liga II
Promoted from Liga III
 Cetatea Suceava
 FC Snagov
 FC Ploiești
 Internațional Curtea de Argeș
 Unirea Sânnicolau Mare**
 Luceafărul-Lotus Băile Felix
 Buftea
 ACU Arad

Relegated from Liga I
 Ceahlăul Piatra Neamț
 Dacia Mioveni
 UTA Arad
 Universitatea Cluj

From Liga II
Relegated to Liga III
 Inter Gaz București
 FCM Reșița
 Focșani
 Politehnica II Timișoara
 Dunărea Galați**
 FC Caracal
 Săcele
 Corvinul 2005 Hunedoara

Promoted to Liga I
 FC Brașov
 Argeș Pitești
 Otopeni
 Gaz Metan Mediaș

Note (**)
Unirea Sânnicolau Mare was absorbed by newly founded FCM Târgu Mureș, as a result of a merge. Unirea Sânnicolau Mare was refounded in the lower leagues.

FCM Câmpina was absorbed by Dunărea Galați, as a result of a merge. Dunărea Galați continued in the second tier on the place of Câmpina and FCM Câmpina was dissolved.

Renamed teams
Luceafărul-Lotus Băile Felix was moved from Băile Felix to Bacău and renamed/ re-founded as Știința Bacău.

IS Câmpia Turzii was renamed as Mechel Câmpia Turzii.

League tables

Seria I

Seria II

Top scorers

Seria I
15 goals
  Ștefan Iordache (Dunărea Giurgiu)
12 goals
  Daniel Costescu (Progresul București) / (Delta Tulcea)
  Costin Curelea (Sportul Studențesc)
  Cristinel Gafița (Ceahlăul Piatra Neamț)
7 goals
  Ștefan Odoroabă (Petrolul Ploiești)
3 goals
  Andrei Boroștean (Botoșani)

Seria II
18 goals
  Sorin Gheju (Târgu Mureș)
15 goals
  Cristian Luca (ACU Arad)
14 goals
  Enache Câju (Râmnicu Vâlcea)
10 goals
  Bogdan Vrăjitoarea (Liberty Salonta)
8 goals
  Lucian Itu (Internațional Curtea de Argeș)
6 goals
  Liviu Antal (Târgu Mureș)
5 goals
  Robert Roszel (UTA Arad)
4 goals
  Marian Constantinescu (Internațional Curtea de Argeș)

See also

2008–09 Liga I
2008–09 Liga III
2008–09 Liga IV

References

Liga II seasons
Rom
2008–09 in Romanian football